Norton Mandeville is a village and former civil parish, now in the parish of High Ongar, in of the Epping Forest district of Essex, England. The settlement is at the north of the parish, and less than 1 mile north from the A414 Harlow to Chelmsford road. In 1961 the civil parish had a population of 187. On the 1 April 1986 the civil parish was merged with High Ongar.

Norton Mandeville has an Anglican parish church dedicated to All Saints.

References

External links

Villages in Essex
Former civil parishes in Essex
Epping Forest District